WBBK-FM (93.1 FM, "Magic 93.1") is a radio station licensed to serve Blakely, Georgia, United States.  The station is owned by Robert H. Holladay, through licensee Alabama Media, LLC.

It broadcasts an urban adult contemporary music format to the Dothan, Alabama, area. WBBK-FM features programming from ABC Radio.

In November 2011, Magic Broadcasting and its Magic Broadcasting Alabama Licensing LLC subsidiary sold the station to Alabama Media Investments, LLC. Alabama Media Investments subsequently sold WBBK-FM to Robert Holladay's Alabama Media, LLC for $260,000; the transaction was consummated on February 28, 2013.

References

External links

BBK-FM
Urban adult contemporary radio stations in the United States
Radio stations established in 1990